SKY Radio is a Russian-language radio station in Estonia. Launched in 1995, Sky Radio is the oldest radio station owned by Sky Media Group. Its sister station in Estonian language is Sky Plus.

References

External links

Radio stations in Estonia
Radio stations established in 1995
Russian-language radio stations
Mass media in Tallinn
Russians in Estonia